Myrtenol is a chemical compound isolated from plants in the genus Taxus.

See also
 Myrtenal

References

Cyclobutanes
Primary alcohols
Monoterpenes